Licata (whence  or Plintis), formerly also Alicata, is a city and comune located on the south coast of Sicily, at the mouth of the Salso River (the ancient Himera), about midway between Agrigento and Gela. It is a major seaport developed at the turn of the twentieth century, shipping sulphur, the refining of which has made Licata the largest European exporting centre, and asphalt, and at times shipping cheese.

(Amore 2002).

History

Ancient 

The settlement was frequented by the Phoenicians who traded there between the 12th and 8th centuries BC. At the end of the 7th century BC the Geloi (inhabitants of ancient Gela) built a fortified station to guard the mouth of the Salso (Himera) river. In the first half of 6th century BC Phalaris, tyrant of Agrigento, built a fortified outpost.

The first settlement was probably founded by colonists from Gela.

At the Battle of the Himera River (311 BC) near the town, Agothocles was beaten by the Carthaginians and the town fell into their hands.

The city itself was re-founded on the right bank of the Salso in 282 BC, by Phintias, tyrant of Agrigentum, who named it for himself (Phintias), after razing the city of Gela and resettling its population here. As late as the 1st century BC, inscriptions and coins show that the inhabitants retained the name Geloi. 

Phintias was laid out on a great scale, with walls, temples and an agora. The site was protected by the headland now named Monte San Michele. Phintias, however, never rose to the importance of Gela.

At nearby Cape Ecnomus, in 256 BC the Romans won the Battle of Cape Ecnomus in the First Punic War and freed the city from the Carthaginians. In 249 BC it afforded shelter to a Roman fleet which was, however, attacked by the Carthaginians and many of the ships sunk. Cicero also alludes to it as a seaport, carrying on a considerable export trade in corn. 

Under the Romans Phintias became a large commercial emporium. But in Strabo's time it seems to have fallen into the same state of decay with the other cities on the south coast of Sicily, as he does not mention it among the few exceptions. Pliny, notices the Phintienses (or Phthinthienses as the name is written in some manuscripts) among the stipendiary towns of Sicily; and its name is found also in Ptolemy; but it is strange that both these writers reckon it among the inland towns of Sicily, though its maritime position is clearly attested both by Diodorus and Cicero. This distance agrees tolerably well with that from Agrigento to Licata, though somewhat less.

Middle and Modern Ages 
The historical centre of the town, near the coastal castle of Lympiados, dates from the period of Byzantine domination. In 827 the Arabs conquered Licata, and their rule lasted for more than two centuries, ending when the town was captured by the Normans on July 25, 1086. During the Norman-Hohenstaufen age the town flourished and was awarded the title of Cittè Demaniale ("Crown's City").

In 1270 Licata (then having some 7,000 inhabitants) rebelled against Angevine rule as part of the uprising known as the Sicilian Vespers. Thereafter the town came under the control of the House of Trastámara, who in 1447 granted it the title of fidelissima ("Most Faithful"). In 1553, after the city was sacked by Dragut's corsairs, it was decided to rebuild the walls, together with a large tower which was erected on the summit of Sant'Angelo hill.

Licata began to flourish once more in the 16th century, thanks in part to the presence of a community of Maltese immigrants, and this period of prosperity continued well into the 17th century, when the first settlements appeared outside the wall, housing the growing Maltese community, and numerous buildings were constructed or rebuilt in the Baroque style. The port also enjoyed a period of prosperity, largely resulting from the export of grain.

Contemporary era 
In 1820 Licata rose against the Bourbon rulers of the Kingdom of the Two Sicilies, led by patriot Matteo Vecchio Verderame. During the Expedition of the Thousand under Giuseppe Garibaldi, the town contributed with a whole corps, and housed for a night Garibaldi's son Menotti and his general Nino Bixio.

The 1870s saw the construction of two bridges connecting to the sulphur mines inland, and five refineries (including the then largest in Europe) were built. This brought a considerable economic expansion, leading to the creation of several elegant residences in Licata.

Licata served as an Allied landing point during the 1943 Operation HUSKY Allied invasion of Sicily of World War II. War damage and the decline in competitiveness in the sulphur industry caused economic decline, forcing many people to emigrate to northern Italy or abroad.  As a town occupied by the Allies, it served as a model for John Hersey's novel A Bell for Adano.

Licata has however maintained its artistic importance, and tourism has begun to flourish again in recent times. Nevertheless, the economy is heavily reliant on the fishing industry.

The Museo Civico displays many archaeological finds, notably material from burial grounds dating from prehistoric times to the 3rd century BC.

Geography
The municipality borders with Butera (CL), Camastra, Campobello di Licata, Naro, Palma di Montechiaro and Ravanusa. It counts the hamlets (frazioni) of Mollarella and Torre di Gaffe.

Main sights

 Archaeological remains of the ancient Greek city, including 7 domus near the centre of the city at Monte Sant'Angelo. The 17th century Castel Sant'Angelo is located nearby.
 The necropolis of Monte Petrulla
 The Grangela, and hydraulic work of Pre-Hellenistic times
 Frourion of Falaride, a Greek fortress
 The lighthouse, which is the third tallest in Italy
 Church of Santa Maria La Nova, built in the 15th century but renovated in later years. It houses the Black Christ's Chapel.
 the Carmine (13th century), including a church and a convent, rebuilt in the 18th century under design by Giovanni Biagio Amico.
 Palazzo di Città, a noteworthy example of Sicilian Liberty style, designed by Ernesto Basile.

Sister cities
  Cestas, France
  Reinheim, Germany

See also
A.S.D. Licata 1931
Licata Airfield

Notes

References
 
 C. Amore et al., "Historical evolution of the Salso River mouth, with respoect to the Licata harbour system" in Eurocoast/EUCC, Littoral 2002 ( on-line)
  Richard Stillwell, ed. Princeton Encyclopedia of Classical Sites, 1976: "Phintias (Licata) Sicily"

External links

 Licata official website
 Licata Today website

 
Coastal towns in Sicily
Ancient cities in Sicily
Ancient Greek archaeological sites in Italy
Colonies of Magna Graecia
Archaeological sites in the province of Agrigento
Populated places established in the 3rd century BC
3rd-century BC establishments in Italy